{{chembox
| Watchedfields = changed
| verifiedrevid = 443847685
| Name = Glyoxylic acid
| ImageFile_Ref = 
| ImageFile = Glyoxylic acid.png
| ImageSize = 150px
| ImageAlt = Skeletal formula of glyoxylic acid
| ImageFile1 = Glyoxylic acid 3D spacefill.png
| ImageSize1 = 160px
| ImageAlt1 = Space-filling model of glyoxylic acid
| PIN = Oxoacetic acid
| SystematicName = Oxoethanoic acid
| OtherNames = Glyoxylic acid2-Oxoacetic acidFormylformic acid
|Section1=
|Section2={{Chembox Properties
| C=2 | H=2 | O=3
| MeltingPtC = 80
| MeltingPt_ref = <ref name=Merck>Merck Index, 11th Edition, 4394</ref>
| BoilingPtC = 111
| Density = 1.384 g/mL
| pKa = 3.18, 3.32 
}}
|Section4=
}}

Glyoxylic acid or oxoacetic acid is an organic compound.  Together with acetic acid, glycolic acid, and oxalic acid, glyoxylic acid is one of the C2 carboxylic acids.  It is a colourless solid that occurs naturally and is useful industrially.

Structure and nomenclature
Although the structure of glyoxylic acid is described as having an aldehyde functional group, the aldehyde is only a minor component of the form most prevalent in some situations. Instead, it often exists as a hydrate or a cyclic dimer. For example, in the presence of water, the carbonyl rapidly converts to a geminal diol (described as the "monohydrate"). The equilibrium constant (K) is 300 for the formation of dihydroxyacetic acid at room temperature:

In solution, the monohydrate exists in equilibrium with a hemiacylal dimer form: 

In isolation, the aldehyde structure has as a major conformer a cyclic hydrogen-bonded structure with the aldehyde carbonyl in close proximity to the carboxyl hydrogen:

The Henry's law constant of glyoxylic acid is KH = 1.09 × 104 × exp[(40.0 × 103/R) × (1/T − 1/298)].

Preparations

The conjugate base of glyoxylic acid is known as glyoxylate and is the form that the compound exists in solution at neutral pH. Glyoxylate is the byproduct of the amidation process in biosynthesis of several amidated peptides.

For the historical record, glyoxylic acid was prepared from oxalic acid electrosynthetically: in organic synthesis, lead dioxide cathodes were applied for preparing glyoxylic acid from oxalic acid in a sulfuric acid electrolyte.

Hot nitric acid can oxidize glyoxal to glyoxylic; however this reaction is highly exothermic and prone to thermal runaway. In addition, oxalic acid is the main side product. 

Also, ozonolysis of maleic acid is effective.

 Biological role 
Glyoxylate is an intermediate of the glyoxylate cycle, which enables organisms, such as bacteria, fungi, and plants  to convert fatty acids into carbohydrates. The glyoxylate cycle is also important for induction of plant defense mechanisms in response to fungi. The glyoxylate cycle is initiated through the activity of isocitrate lyase, which converts isocitrate into glyoxylate and succinate. Research is being done to co-opt the pathway for a variety of uses such as the biosynthesis of succinate.

 In humans 
Glyoxylate is produced via two pathways: through the oxidation of glycolate in peroxisomes or through the catabolism of hydroxyproline in mitochondria. In the peroxisomes, glyoxylate is converted into glycine by AGT1 or into oxalate by glycolate oxidase. In the mitochondria, glyoxylate is converted into glycine by AGT2 or into glycolate by glyoxylate reductase. A small amount of glyoxylate is converted into oxalate by cytoplasmic lactate dehydrogenase. 

 In plants 
In addition to being an intermediate in the glyoxylate cycle, glyoxylate is also an important intermediate in the photorespiration pathway. Photorespiration is a result of the side reaction of RuBisCO with O2 instead of CO2. While at first considered a waste of energy and resources, photorespiration has been shown to be an important method of regenerating carbon and CO2, removing toxic phosphoglycolate, and initiating defense mechanisms. In photorespiration, glyoxylate is converted from glycolate through the activity of glycolate oxidase in the peroxisome. It is then converted into glycine through parallel actions by SGAT and GGAT, which is then transported into the mitochondria. It has also been reported that the pyruvate dehydrogenase complex may play a role in glycolate and glyoxylate metabolism. 

 Disease relevance 

 Diabetes 
Glyoxylate is thought to be a potential early marker for Type II diabetes. One of the key conditions of diabetes pathology is the production of advanced glycation end-products (AGEs) caused by the hyperglycemia. AGEs can lead to further complications of diabetes, such as tissue damage and cardiovascular disease. They are generally formed from reactive aldehydes, such as those present on reducing sugars and alpha-oxoaldehydes. In a study, glyoxylate levels were found to be significantly increased in patients who were later diagnosed with Type II diabetes. The elevated levels were found sometimes up to three years before the diagnosis, demonstrating the potential role for glyoxylate to be an early predictive marker.

 Nephrolithiasis 
Glyoxylate is involved in the development of hyperoxaluria, a key cause of nephrolithiasis (commonly known as kidney stones). Glyoxylate is both a substrate and inductor of sulfate anion transporter-1 (sat-1), a gene responsible for oxalate transportation, allowing it to increase sat-1 mRNA expression and as a result oxalate efflux from the cell. The increased oxalate release allows the buildup of calcium oxalate in the urine, and thus the eventual formation of kidney stones.

The disruption of glyoxylate metabolism provides an additional mechanism of hyperoxaluria development. Loss of function mutations in the HOGA1 gene leads to a loss of the 4-hydroxy-2-oxoglutarate aldolase, an enzyme in the hydroxyproline to glyoxylate pathway. The glyoxylate resulting from this pathway is normally stored away to prevent oxidation to oxalate in the cytosol. The disrupted pathway, however, causes a buildup of 4-hydroxy-2-oxoglutarate which can also be transported to the cytosol and converted into glyoxylate through a different aldolase. These glyoxylate molecules can be oxidized into oxalate increasing its concentration and causing hyperoxaluria.

 Reactions and uses 
Glyoxylic acid is about ten times stronger an acid than acetic acid, with an acid dissociation constant of 4.7 × 10−4 (pK''a = 3.32):
OCHCO2H      +  H+

With base, glyoxylic acid disproportionates, forming hydroxyacetic acid and oxalic acid:
2 OCHCO2H  +  H2O   →   HOCH2CO2H  +  HO2CCO2H

Glyoxylic acid gives heterocycles upon condensation with urea and 1,2-diaminobenzene.

Phenol derivatives
In general, glyoxylic acid undergoes an electrophilic aromatic substitution reaction with phenols, a versatile step in the synthesis of several other compounds.

The immediate product with phenol itself is 4-hydroxymandelic acid. This species reacts with ammonia to give hydroxyphenylglycine, a precursor to the drug amoxicillin. Reduction of the 4-hydroxymandelic acid gives 4-hydroxyphenylacetic acid, a precursor to the drug atenolol.

The sequence of reactions, in which glyoxylic acid reacts with guaiacol the phenolic component followed by oxidation and decarboxylation, provides a route to vanillin as a net formylation process.

Hopkins Cole reaction
Glyoxylic acid is a component of the Hopkins–Cole reaction, used to check for the presence of tryptophan in proteins.

Environmental chemistry
Glyoxylic acid is one of several ketone- and aldehyde-containing carboxylic acids that together are abundant in secondary organic aerosols. In the presence of water and sunlight, glyoxylic acid can undergo photochemical oxidation. Several different reaction pathways can ensue, leading to various other carboxylic acid and aldehyde products.

Safety

References

Conjugated aldehydes
Aldehydic acids